Lee Roy Mahaffey (February 9, 1904 – July 23, 1969) was a pitcher in Major League Baseball. He played for the Pittsburgh Pirates, Philadelphia Athletics, and St. Louis Browns. His key pitch was a fast-breaking curveball.

In nine seasons, Mahaffey posted a 67-49 record with a 5.01 earned run average in 1,056 innings pitched with 365 strikeouts.

As a hitter, Mahaffey posted a .184 batting average (73-for-396) with 28 runs, 4 home runs and 33 RBI in 224 games pitched.

References

External links

1904 births
1969 deaths
Major League Baseball pitchers
Pittsburgh Pirates players
Philadelphia Athletics players
St. Louis Browns players
Baseball players from South Carolina
People from Belton, South Carolina